William  II may refer to:

 William II, Duke of Aquitaine (died 926)
 William II, Marquess of Montferrat (died c. 961)
 William II Sánchez of Gascony (died c. 996)
 William II, Count of Provence (c. 987–1019)
 William II, Count of Besalú (died 1066)
 William II of Normandy (c. 1028–1087), William I of England
 William II of England (c. 1056 –1100), commonly referred to as William Rufus
 William   II, Count of Burgundy (1061–1125)
 William II Jordan (died 1109), Count of Berga, Count of Cerdanya and Regent of Tripoli
 William II, Duke of Apulia (1095–1127), Duke of Apulia and Calabria
 William de Warenne, 2nd Earl of Surrey (died 1138)
 William II, Count of Nevers (1098–1147)
 William II of Bures (died 1158), Crusader lord of the Kingdom of Jerusalem, Prince of Galilee
 William II of Sicily (1155–1189)
 William II, Lord of Béthune (died 1214), nicknamed William the Red
 William II, Count of Perche (died 1226), Bishop of Châlons
 William II of Dampierre (1196–1231)
 William II Longespee (c. 1204–m
 William de Wickwane (died 1285), Archbishop of York (1279–1285)
 William II, Lord of Egmond (died 1304)
 William II de Soules (died c. 1320), Lord of Liddesdale and Butler of Scotland
 William II, Earl of Ross (ruled 1274–1323)
 William II, Duke of Brunswick-Lüneburg (1300s–1369)
 William II, Count of Hainaut (1307–1345), Count of Holland and Count of Zeeland
 William II, Duke of Athens (1312–1338)
 William II, Duke of Jülich (1327–1393)
 William II, Marquis of Namur (1355–1418)
 William II, Margrave of Meissen (1371–1425)
 William II, Duke of Bavaria (ruled 1404–1417)
 William II d'Estouteville (1412–1483), French bishop and cardinal
 William II, Princely count of Henneberg-Schleusingen (1415–1444)
 William II, Duke of Brunswick-Calenberg-Göttingen or William the Younger (1425–1503), Duke of Brunswick-Lüneburg
 William II, Landgrave of Hesse (1469–1509)
 William II de La Marck (1542–1578), Dutch Lord of Lumey and admiral of the Watergeuzen
 William II, Prince of Orange (1626–1650), stadtholder of the United Provinces of the Netherlands
 William II of Scotland (1650–1702), William III of England
 William II, Prince of Nassau-Dillenburg (1670–1724)
 William II, Landgrave of Hesse-Wanfried-Rheinfels (1671–1731)
 William II of the Netherlands (1792–1849), Grand Duke of Luxembourg and Duke of Limburg
 William II of Bimbia (died 1882), known as Young King William
 William II of Württemberg (1848–1921)
 William II, German Emperor (1859–1941)

See also

 Wilhelm II (disambiguation)
 Willem II (disambiguation)

eo:Vilhelmo (regantoj)#Vilhelmo la 2-a